Minturno is a city and comune in the southern Lazio, Italy, situated on the north west bank of the Garigliano (known in antiquity as the Liris), with a suburb on the opposite bank about  from its mouth, at the point where the Via Appia crossed it by the bridge called Pons Tiretius.

It has a station on the Rome-Naples main railway line.

History

The nearby sanctuary of Marica with an Italic tuff temple was built about 500 BC.

Ancient Minturnae was one of the three towns of the Ausones which made war against Rome in 314 BC, in the Second Samnite War, the other two being Ausona (modern Sessa Aurunca) and Vescia. It became a Roman settlement as a fort (Castrum Minturnae) in about 296 BC. The early town grew around the square fort with polygonal stone walls on the side of the river and on the contemporary via Appia as a military road. In the 3rd c. BC the town expanded with new tufa walls with towers. 

In 88 BC Gaius Marius hid himself in the marshes of Minturnae in his flight from Sulla.

The city was radically transformed when it became a colonia under Augustus when the urban tract of the via Appia was enhanced with porticos, temples to Augustus and Julius Caesar were built and the theatre was rebuilt.

The city was further expanded under Hadrian with thermal baths, the macellum, nymphaeum and aqueduct. 

It was destroyed by the Langobards in 590.

The city was probably also destroyed in 883 by the Saracens, who in the following years held the surrounding plain.

The Saracens were ousted by the Catholic league after the Battle of Garigliano (915), and Minturnae passed to Gaeta. Two years later, however, it was again ravaged, this time by the Magyars. In 1058 it was partly acquired by the Abbey of Montecassino, but soon after was conquered by the Normans.

In the 13th century it went to Richard V dell'Aquila, duke of Gaeta. Subsequently, it was a Caetani possession, and later assigned by Charles VIII of France to his general Prospero Colonna. It was a Carafa fief until 1806, and was integrated in the newly formed Kingdom of Italy on 30 October 1861.

Minturno was part of the Gustav Line during  World War II, and suffered heavy bombing.

Main sights

Roman remains

Many of the main momumental buildings of the ancient city are visible at their site outside the modern city. The impressive Roman remains mainly date to the Hadrianic period (built over earlier buildings) and consist of the:

 theatre in opus reticulatum
 aqueduct in opus reticulatum, the quoins of which are of various colours arranged in patterns to produce a decorative effect. A unique feature was that its castellum aquae (distribution basin) was part of the central pier of the city gate. It was more than 11 Km long from its source at the springs of Capodacqua.
 thermal baths with large swimming pool
 Two Fora; Republican and Imperial. The imperial forum was built under the reconstruction by Augustus, opposite the republican forum. On its eastern side were later the most important public buildings: the curia and the basilica
 Appian Way as the decumanus maximus with monumental colonnade though the centre of the city
 macellum (meat market)
 Capitolium, built in Italic style after 191 BC, on the south of the Republican forum next to the Appian Way. It is similar to other Capitolia of this period at Pyrgi and Cosa and most likely was an affirmation of Roman loyalty and identity
 amphitheatre (now almost entirely demolished, but better preserved in the 18th century)

Close to the mouth of the river, about 2km distant, was the sacred grove of the Italic goddess Marica.

Other sights

The baronial Castle (C. 9th century) housed famous figures such as St. Thomas Aquinas, Isabella Colonna and Giulia Gonzaga
The church of St. Francis, built around 1360 by Roffredo III Caetani, nephew of Pope Boniface VIII
The church of Annunziata (c. 1300), damaged by the Turks pirates in 1552, by the French-Polish troops in 1799 and by a fire in 1888. In 1930 a restoration removed all the Baroque additions and showed the presence of ancient frescoes.
The church of St. Peter (11th-12th centuries). The façade is preceded by a staircase and a porch with 4 arcades (14th century). The interior has a nave and two aisles divided by tall columns with ogival arcs. The right aisle houses the notable Baroque Sacrament Chapel (1587), decorated with polychrome marbles. Other art pieces include a candelabra (1264) with mosaic decoration, and the Pergagum, with antique columns and 13th-century mosaics. It has a three-floor belfry.
Ferdinandeo Bridge over the River Garigliano was the first iron catenary suspension bridge built in Italy, and one of the earliest in continental Europe. This bridge, which was technologically advanced for its age, was built in 1832 by the Bourbon Kingdom of Two Sicilies. 
The engineer who designed the bridge was Luigi Giura. The bridge has been rebuilt in recent time (1998), in fact was mined during the Second World War.

The suburb of Scauri, on the Gulf of Gaeta, may take its name from the Roman consul Marcus Aemilius Scaurus, who had a sumptuous villa here. It has some notable ancient watchtowers, including the Torre Saracena, at the mouth of the river Garigliano, erected between 961 and 981, commemorates a victory gained by Pope John X and his allies over the Saracens in 915 (see battle of Garigliano). It is built of Roman materials from Minturnae, including several inscriptions and sculptures.

Emigrants

In the early 20th century, many residents of Minturno and the villages around it emigrated to Stamford, Connecticut, in the United States. A club for Minturnese immigrants, the Minturno Social Club was founded in the West Side of Stamford in 1939 (and has since moved to the Springdale district) and only made up of members whose families hailed from Minturno, had 120 members in 2007. A Minturnese tradition, the Festa de la Regna ("Festival of Wheat") celebration of harvest day and honoring the Madonna delle Grazie, is still honored in Stamford with an annual procession.

Michael Fedele, former lieutenant governor of Connecticut, was born in Minturno in 1955.

Twin towns
  Stamford, USA, since 2008

References

Sources

External links
 

Municipalities of the Province of Latina
Roman sites in Lazio
Baroque architecture in Lazio